The country leaf-toed gecko (Hemidactylus agrius) is a species of gecko from the family of Gekkonidae, found in northeastern Brazil.

References

Hemidactylus
Reptiles of Brazil
Endemic fauna of Brazil
Reptiles described in 1978
Taxa named by Paulo Vanzolini